The  GoPro Indy Grand Prix of Sonoma was an open-wheel IndyCar motor race and held as the fourteenth and penultimate round of the 2012 IndyCar Series season. It took place on Sunday, August 26, 2012.

The race was won by Australian racer Ryan Briscoe racing for Team Penske. Briscoe finished 0.4 seconds ahead of Australian team mate Will Power with British driver Dario Franchitti finishing third for Chip Ganassi Racing. It was Briscoe's first win since the 2010 Firestone 550, and also his last win in IndyCar. Brazilian driver and Formula One veteran Rubens Barrichello finished fourth in his best result since joining IndyCar. Power's second place, coupled with Ryan Hunter-Reay finishing 18th expanded Power's lead in the championship. Power led Hunter-Reay by 36 points.

The event marked a notable change in the course layout. The cars used the inner loop at the back hairpin instead of the outer loop in order to open a passing zone. The exit of the bus stop was widened to allow for more room. Another passing zone was established by using a part of the hairpin instead of cutting it off altogether.

Classification

Race results

Notes
 Points include 1 point for pole position and 2 points for most laps led.

Standings after the race

Drivers' Championship

Manufacturers' Championship

Note: Only the top five positions are included for the driver standings.

References

External links

Indy Grand Prix of Sonoma
GoPro Indy Grand Prix of Sonoma
GoPro Indy Grand Prix of Sonoma
GoPro Indy Grand Prix of Sonoma